"Bad Apple!!" is the sixth track in the soundtrack of the 1998 bullet hell video game Lotus Land Story, the fourth entry in the Touhou Project series created by Team Shanghai Alice. The instrumental theme was originally designed to be played during the third stage of the game, as chiptune on the Japanese NEC PC-9800 computer platform, at 161 beats per minute using a frequency modulation synthesis chip. The Lotus Land Story version that has 1.3 million views on YouTube is a remake of the song from an official Touhou album named Akyu's Untouched Score Volume 1 and was released on the 21st of May, 2006.

It is notable for leading to a much later cover by Alstroemeria Records and a subsequent accompanying black-and-white shadow puppet-video – commonly called Shadow-art. The video became a minor Japanese internet meme in the late 2000s, correlating with the peak of Touhou'''s popularity, and experienced a resurgence in the mid-2010s when the black-and-white video was ported to esoteric media such as obsolete hardware, displays created within sandbox video games (e.g. Minecraft), and other unusual media as a graphical test. It has achieved more then 69 million videos on YouTube.

Since then, Alstroemeria Records' version has been licensed to various other video game companies that acquired a Touhou licence, and has been guest featured in many Rhythm games such as Groove Coaster, Muse Dash and even officially licensed spin-offs such as Touhou Spell Bubble as the game's tutorial track and free play song.

 Pop song 

On 20 May 2007, the day of the 4th Reitaisai convention, a longer cover version featuring the Japanese singer nomico was released on the album Lovelight by the doujin circle Alstroemeria Records, led by Masayoshi Minoshima. It shared little similarity with the original soundtrack, borrowing only a little of melody samples, but nonetheless it was notable as being the only vocal song in the album, and for its lyrics dealing with depression and apathy.

From May 2017 to August 2018, Alstroemeria Records released a series of 10th Anniversary Bad Apple!! albums consisting entirely of remixes and covers of their version of "Bad Apple!!".

 Music video 
June 8, 2008, a user in Nico Nico Douga uploaded a video of a crude storyboard based on Alstroemeria Records' version, asking for anyone to animate it. Several animation videos started appearing, with relatively few successes.

Between October 2008 and October 2009, a collaborative group led by Anira (あにら) created a shadow-art (black and white) animation video based on the storyboard, which was released on Nico Nico on 26 October 2009. It quickly grew in popularity as a minor internet meme – as of November 2021, the original Nico Nico upload had been viewed more than 29 million times and a YouTube reupload more than 69 million. The video itself shows many of the Windows-era Touhou Project characters up to Scarlet Weather Rhapsody'' as they transition between one another.

Use as a graphical and audio test 
The song saw a rise in popularity in the mid-2010s, when the shadow-art video was ported to several second-generation video game consoles and graphing calculators – presumed to be incapable of playing back full-motion video – for retrocomputing and demoscene competitions. In this way, the video became a graphical equivalent to "Hello, World!" programs.

 In June 2014, the "8088 Domination" demo included a section rendering the "Bad Apple" shadow video on an 1981-era IBM 5150 at 640×200 resolution and 30 frames per second.
 In June 2014, about two minutes of "Bad Apple" have been ported to the Commodore 64 as 2000 frames at 12 frames per second on a single side diskette.
 By 2015, "Bad Apple" had been ported to the 1982 Vectrex console; along with ports to the 1977–Atari 2600, 1985–Nintendo Entertainment System (NES), 1988–Sega Genesis, and Texas Instruments TI-84 Plus series graphing calculators.
 In 2017 fenarinarsa released an Atari STE demo rendering the video at 320×200 resolution at 30fps with 50 kHz audio.
 In 2019, an Arduino Mega was programmed to render the video (without sound) at 128×176 resolution and 60 frames per second.
 In 2020, an Amiga AGA demo was released at the NOVA2020 demoparty.
 In early 2021, a subreddit by the name of r/ItPlaysBadApple was created. It hosts videos and tutorials on the usage of various devices that are able to play Bad Apple!! Oscilloscopes often make an appearance, as well as videos of the shadow-art being played inside other games (e.g. Minecraft) and software.

References 

Touhou Project
1998 in Japanese music
Video game soundtracks
Silhouettes
Demoscene
Test items
Test items in computer languages
Computer graphics
Image processing
Computer programming folklore
Internet memes introduced in the 2000s